La Aurora is a metrocable station on line J of the Medellín Metro. It is located in the northwest corner of Medellín. La Aurora is the terminal station on line J that goes to La Aurora and Suramericana neighborhoods.

References

External links
 Official site of Medellín Metro 

Medellín Metro stations